The Dutch-American Friendship Treaty (also known as DAFT or Dutch American Residency Treaty) is an agreement between the United States and the Netherlands signed into law at The Hague on March 27, 1956. The treaty is a treaty of friendship, commerce and navigation with protocols. The treaty allows US Entrepreneurs to acquire Dutch residency for the purpose of starting a business. The treaty also allows Dutch traders and investors to enter the US and engage in business in the US.

Implications for US Entrepreneurs

The treaty makes it easier for US Entrepreneurs to open businesses in The Netherlands. It lowers the amount of needed investment capital from €27,000 to €4,500, frees US Entrepreneurs from the points-based test, and removes the benefit to Dutch national interests requirement. The residency permit is good for two years, after which it can be renewed for five years. The treaty is valid for all US citizens who are opening a business in the Netherlands or its territories.

Implications for Dutch Traders and Investors
The treaty allows Dutch traders, executives and specialized employees to enter the US with the E1 or E2 visa. The E1 visa is for traders whereas the E2 visa is for investors.

References

External links
 Immigration and Naturalisation Service webpage about the self-employment visa
 US Customs and Immigration Services webpage about E1 visas for Treaty Traders
 US Customs and Immigration Services webpage about E2 visas for Treaty Investors

Treaties of the United States
Treaties concluded in 1956
Treaties of the Netherlands
Netherlands–United States relations
1956 in the Netherlands